Rajkumar Dayaram Patel is an Indian politician in the Prahar Janshakti Party. He was elected as a member of the Maharashtra Legislative Assembly from Melghat on 24 October 2019. Three time MLA (Member of Legislative Assembly), elected from the tribal Korku community from the Melghat Region, he is one of the most popular leaders of the district, known for his direct action plan with the Forest Department and Local Administration. He is the son of the late MLA Dayaram Patel, senior congress leader (Cabinet Minister For Forest State) 2nd Vidhan Sabha 1967. He entered into politics after his graduation from Amravati University and contested his first MLA election in 1995 on a BSP ticket and lost by a very small margin. He ran again in the 1999 contested election on a BJP ticket and won with a high vote difference defending senior Congress Leader late Ramu Patel, and had another victory in 2004. He lost twice consecutively in 2009 and 2014. Highly involved in public activities and social welfare, people gave him another chance in 2019, where he got his highest victory ever, won by 50,000 votes on a Prahar Janshakti Party ticket.

References

Living people
Members of the Maharashtra Legislative Assembly
Prahar Janshakti Party politicians
Year of birth missing (living people)